Dycladia is a genus of moths in the subfamily Arctiinae. The genus was described by Felder in 1874.

Species
 Dycladia basimacula Schaus, 1924
 Dycladia correbioides Felder, 1869
 Dycladia lucetius Cramer, 1782
 Dycladia lydia Druce, 1900
 Dycladia marmana Schaus, 1924
 Dycladia melaena Hampson, 1898
 Dycladia transacta Walker
 Dycladia vitrina Rothschild, 1911
 Dycladia xanthobasis Hampson, 1909

References

External links

Euchromiina
Moth genera